This article contains lists of named passenger trains in Southeast Asia, listed by country.

International service

Indonesia

Malaysia

Thailand  

Southeast Asia
Asia transport-related lists